The Boston Stone is a stone in Boston, Massachusetts. Near —but not on— the Freedom Trail, it is a minor tourist attraction.

Below the stone is a plinth inscribed "Boston Stone 1737". There is no plaque and no further elucidation, and the Boston Stone has no official status.

History

The stone was originally a millstone used for grinding paint pigments. It was imported from England in 1635 or 1700 by the painter Tom Childs. in 1836, the stone was recovered while the foundations for the present building were being dug, and was placed in the brick wall in the building that still stands today.

According to popular legend and some sources, the stone is the geographic center of Boston, as it was used in colonial times by surveyors as the zero point for outlying milestones showing the distance to Boston, analogous to the London Stone, but this is almost certainly not true – there are no contemporary records indicating this, the 1767 Milestones stretching from Boston to Springfield, Massachusetts are not based on the Boston Stone, and the Old State House would have been a more likely center point for measuring distances to the city. 19th-century advertising for the Marshall House inn describes the original inscribing of the Boston Stone's plinth, and perhaps its attribution as Boston's zero milestone, as an early 19th-century advertising ploy.  Nonetheless, the 1921 Rand, McNally guide to the city opined that it was probably set up to provide directions to nearby shops in imitation of the London Stone.

References

External links

 

Landmarks in Boston
Stones
Government Center, Boston